Transport today is mostly powered by fossil fuel.  The reason for this is the ease of use and the existence of mature technologies harnessing this fuel source.  Fossil fuels represent a concentrated, relatively compact source of energy.  The drawbacks are that they are heavily polluting and rely on limited natural resources.  There are many proposals to harness renewable forms of energy, to use fossil fuel more efficiently, or to use human power, or some hybrid of these, to move people and things.

The list below contains some forms of transport not in general use, but considered as possibilities in the future.

Proposed future transport 
Air-propelled train (abandoned in 19th century)
Bounce tube pneumatic travel (Proposed by Robert A. Heinlein in 1956)
Vactrain also known as ET3
BiModal Glideway (Dual Mode Transportation System) travel (Proposed by William D. Davis, Jr. in 1967)
TEV Project (proposed by Will Jones in Summer 2012)
Dual-mode vehicle 
Hyperloop
Intelligent Transportation System
Jet pack
Backpack helicopter
Personal air vehicle (Flying car)
Personal rapid transit
Shweeb
Rolling road (proposed by Robert A. Heinlein in 1940)
Slidewalk (proposed by Robert A. Heinlein in 1948)
Teleportation
SkyTran
 Spacecraft propulsion or Space transport
 Launch loop
 Orbital ring
 Light sail (proposed by Jack Vance in 1962)
 Space elevator (proposed by Russian scientist Konstantin Tsiolkovsky in 1895)

References

External links 
 Global Intelligent Transportation System (proposed by Vladimir Postnikov in 2010)

Future
Future transport